Mount Vernon High School is a public high school in the Fairfax County Public Schools system located in Mount Vernon, Virginia.

History
Originally constructed to take the place of the Lee-Jackson High School, Mount Vernon High school first opened in November 1939. With the opening of the school, Lee-Jackson principal G. Claude Cox moved to Mount Vernon, becoming the school's first principal, and Lee-Jackson became an elementary school.

In 1945, Principal Cox resigned to become principal of Wythe High School in Wytheville, Virginia, and Lee-Jackson principal Melvin B. Landes moved to Mount Vernon to begin a nearly thirty-year tenure there.

The school's current location was built in 1961 as Walt Whitman Intermediate School. In 1973, Mount Vernon and Whitman swapped facilities, and the former intermediate school was enlarged to serve its new role as a high school. The original Mount Vernon High School continued to operate as the Walt Whitman Intermediate School until 1985, when Whitman was moved to the former Stephen Foster Intermediate School.

Also in 1973, Principal Melvin Landes retired, and Thomas G. Hyer took over as Principal.

Following the departure of Eric Brent to become principal at Forest Park High School in Woodbridge, Nardos King became the principal of MVHS in 2006.

After nine years as principal, Nardos King resigned in 2015 to take a position as Assistant Superintendent of High Schools with the Baltimore County Public Schools system. Assistant Principal Esther Manns became the interim principal of MVHS in September 2015. In February 2016, Rocky Run Middle School Principal Dr. Anthony S. Terrell was announced as the principal of Mount Vernon High School, beginning in March.

The original Mount Vernon High School is still standing on Richmond Highway; it became the Islamic Saudi Academy, which moved to the facility in 1989. This school closed in 2016.

Academic achievement
Students with individual needs are accommodated through special education programs, including English for speakers of other languages (ESOL) program, and advanced placement and International Baccalaureate programs. Mount Vernon is an accredited, high school. The average SAT score in 2013 for Mount Vernon was a 1417 (479 in Critical Reading, 474 in Math, and 464 in Writing).

Demographics
For the 2014-15 school year, Mount Vernon High School's student body was 37.80% Hispanic, 29.56% Black, 20.91% White, 6.36% Asian and 5.37% Other.

Athletics
School athletic programs feature fall, winter and spring sports, including cheerleading, cross country, field hockey, football, golf, volleyball, basketball, gymnastics, swimming, wrestling, baseball, crew, lacrosse, softball, soccer, tennis, track and intramural sports.

In Mount Vernon's history, it has garnered five AAA State Championship titles. They won their first title in 1979, in basketball, their second in 1983, for football, their third in 2008 for the swim & dive team, and a fourth in 2013, for soccer, as well as one for wrestling.

Theater
Mount Vernon's "Little Theater," officially named "The Andrew Lee Pauley Theater," was dedicated to an English and Drama teacher who retired from the school in 1986. The Little Theater can hold a capacity of more than 400 students.

It is home to MVHS Theatre Arts program.  Other notable events include "Mr. Mount Vernon" and "Miss Personality," that are held annually.

Notable alumni
Callie Brownson, American football coach
Ed Cunningham, former professional football player and currently TV sports journalist, analyst, and broadcaster.
Christina Chambers, actress
Gary Etherington, professional soccer player
Atlee Hammaker, former Major League Baseball pitcher
Tim Koogle, first CEO and President of Yahoo 
Tony Perkins, Chief Weatherman, WTTG-TV.
Chuck Robb, former U.S. Senator and Governor of Virginia.
Markus Rogan, professional swimmer who earned a silver medal in backstroke at the 2004 Olympics
William B. Taylor Jr., U.S. Ambassador to Ukraine 2006-2009 
Syd Thrift, former MLB scout and executive, was baseball coach at Mt. Vernon 1953–1956
Lucian K. Truscott IV, writer and journalist
Lieutenant General Darryl A. Williams, current Superintendent of the United States Military Academy
Jonathan H. Ward, space historian and writer

References

Educational institutions established in 1939
High schools in Fairfax County, Virginia
Public high schools in Virginia
1939 establishments in Virginia